S curve or S-curve may refer to:

 S-curve (art), an "S"-shaped curve which serves a wide variety of compositional purposes
 S-curve (math), a characteristic "S"-shaped curve of a Sigmoid function
 S-curve corset, an Edwardian corset style
 S-Curve Records, a record company label
 Reverse curve, or "S" curve, in civil engineering

See also 

 Recurve (disambiguation)